Leslie Clark Stevens IV (February 3, 1924 – April 24, 1998) was an American producer, writer, and director. He created two television series for the ABC network, The Outer Limits (1963–1965) and Stoney Burke (1962–63), and Search (1972–73) for NBC. Stevens was the director of the horror film Incubus (1966), which stars William Shatner, and was the second film to use the Esperanto language. He wrote an early work of New Age philosophy, est: The Steersman Handbook (1970).

Biography
Stevens was born in Washington, D.C. His interest in science was sparked when he studied for the United States Naval Academy at the behest of his father, Leslie Clark Stevens III, an admiral in the United States Navy. But the Broadway theater intrigued him more than a military career, and he headed for New York as a fledgling writer.
He sold his play The Mechanical Rat, to Orson Welles's Mercury Theatre and ran away from home to join the troupe before being returned home by truant officers.

During World War II he served in the United States Army Air Forces becoming a Captain at the age of 20.  He attended Yale's Drama Department following the war.

His first play Bullfight starring Hurd Hatfield opened off Broadway in 1954.  It was followed by The Champagne Complex the following year. His play The Lovers (1956), starring Joanne Woodward, was later filmed as The War Lord (1965). He wrote the Broadway comedy The Marriage-Go-Round (1956), which he adapted to the screen, and produced, as a starring vehicle for Susan Hayward, which was released in 1961. He wrote the screenplay for the film The Left Handed Gun (1958) directed by Arthur Penn and starring Paul Newman. Other films which Stevens produced, and directed and wrote included Hero's Island (1962) starring James Mason, and Private Property (1960) starring Corey Allen, Warren Oates and his then-wife Kate Manx. He also directed the feature film Incubus (1966), which was filmed entirely in the constructed language Esperanto.

Through Daystar Productions, Stevens created the television series Stoney Burke, followed by The Outer Limits which he supervised as executive producer and wrote or directed a handful of episodes, including the pilot The Galaxy Being in which Stevens supplied the voice of the extraterrestrial.

Stevens was writer, director and executive producer of the pilot film and major episodes of It Takes a Thief and McCloud and wrote and produced installments for the series The Invisible Man and Buck Rogers in the 25th Century (which he co-developed with Glen A. Larson). He also produced the first-season Tony Franciosa episodes of The Name of the Game and the short-lived 1972–73 NBC science fiction series Search. Although only credited as supervising producer of "Saga of a Star-World" (the 1978 pilot episode of the Larson-produced Battlestar Galactica), director Alan J. Levi has alleged that "Stevens wrote the original script. Leslie was one of my best friends. I do know that Leslie had told me at one time way before he ever got into the script that he had this great idea for a script that he was going to take to Glen Larson and talk about."

Stevens also wrote for the revival show of The Outer Limits between 1996 and 1997.

Stevens's contributions to the New Age Movement, and its relationships to The Outer Limits are discussed in the book Taoism for Dummies (John Wiley and Sons Canada, 2013).

Stevens died from complications of an emergency angioplasty in 1998 in Los Angeles, California at the age of 74.

Quotes

See also
 Nightmare (1998 The Outer Limits)

Bibliography

References

External links

1924 births
1998 deaths
American male screenwriters
American television directors
Writers from Los Angeles
Yale School of Drama alumni
20th-century American non-fiction writers
American science fiction writers
20th-century American male writers
Film directors from Los Angeles
Film directors from Washington, D.C.
American male non-fiction writers
Screenwriters from California
Screenwriters from Washington, D.C.
20th-century American screenwriters
United States Army Air Forces personnel of World War II